Raymond Edward Smith Jr. (born October 15, 1961) is a former Democratic member of the North Carolina House of Representatives, who represented the 21st district (including portions of Wayne and Sampson counties) from 2019 to 2023.

Career
Smith won the election on November 6, 2018 from the platform of Democratic Party. He secured fifty-three percent of the vote while his closest rival Republican Robert Freeman Sr. secured forty-seven percent. He was re-elected in 2020.

In 2022, Smith challenged incumbent state senator Toby Fitch in the Democratic primary for North Carolina's 4th Senate district. Smith lost the primary, winning only 45.5% of the vote to Fitch's 54.5%.

Smith currently plans to run for Lieutenant Governor of North Carolina in the 2024 election.

Electoral history

2022

2020

2018

Committee assignments

2021-2022 session
Education - Community Colleges 
Local Government 
Federal Relations and American Indian Affairs 
Finance 
Homeland Security, Military, and Veterans Affairs
LGBTQ+ Rights and Restrictions

2019–2020 session
House Appropriations on Health and Human Services 
Appropriations 
Homeland Security, Military, and Veterans Affairs 
Transportation

References

Smith, Raymond
Living people
21st-century American politicians
1961 births
North Carolina A&T State University alumni
North Carolina Central University alumni
Fayetteville State University alumni